Chroogomphus  is a genus of mushrooms commonly known as pine-spikes or spike-caps based on their shape and because they are often found growing in association with pine trees. The genus is distributed throughout the Northern Hemisphere including North America, the Caribbean, Europe, and Asia.

Taxonomy
These fungi are members of the family Gomphidiaceae which are agaricoid members of the Boletales (suborder Suillineae). Related to the genus Gomphidius (in which they were once classified), Chroogomphus are distinguished from Gomphidius by their lack of a partial veil.

The genus name is derived from the Greek χρω- chroo-, meaning 'skin' or 'colour', and 'γομφος' gomphos meaning 'plug' or 'large wedge-shaped nail'.

Ecology
Members of this genus have been thought to be ectomycorrhizal with various species of pine, however, there is now evidence that all members of the Gomphidiaceae are parasitic upon other boletes. Specifically, Chroogomphus species are thought to be parasitic on various conifer-associated Suillus species, with this parasitism often being highly species-specific.  In the Pacific Northwest of North America, C. tomentosus is found with western hemlock (Tsuga heterophylla) and Douglas-fir (Pseudotsuga menziesii), while C. helveticus of Europe is found in conifer forests containing spruce (Picea ssp.).

Species

Chroogomphus rutilus (image), found in Europe, is the type species for this genus.  It has been the subject of investigation as the source of antibiotics, as well as other potentially useful secondary compounds.

The cap is up to 10 cm in diameter and red-brown in colour.  The widely spaced gills are brownish-orange and decurrent with black to brownish-yellow spores. The stalk is brownish-yellow and tapers toward the base. The flesh is orange to salmon-coloured and turns violet when chewed.

Chroogomphus ochraceus (image) of North America is very similar in habit and appearance to C. rutilus, and the latter name has often been misapplied to C. ochraceus.

Chroogomphus vinicolor (image), another North American species, is likewise similar to C. rutilus, although C. vinicolor tends to be smaller.  The cap color is variable in both species, with C. vinicolor being, as its scientific name suggests, more wine-colored while C. rutilus is usually more brown.  The most distinctive differences between these three species are microscopic. 

Other species within genus Chroogomphus include:

Edibility
Chroogomphus rutilus, C. ochraceus, C. oregonensis, C. tomentosus, and C. vinicolor are edible and may be interchangeable for culinary purposes.  They are not, however, regarded as flavorful and possess neither a distinctive taste nor odor.  One food writer states about C. rutilus and C. vinicolor:

References

Further reading
Arora D. (1986) Mushrooms Demystified. Berkeley, CA: Ten Speed Press. 

Nilsson S. & Persson O. (1977) Fungi of Northern Europe 1: Larger Fungi (Excluding Gill Fungi). Penguin Books. 

Boletales
Boletales genera
Taxa named by Rolf Singer